The conquest of Wu by Jin was a military campaign launched by the Western Jin dynasty against the Eastern Wu dynasty in 280 at the end of the Three Kingdoms period (220–280) of China. The campaign concluded with the fall of Eastern Wu and the reunification of China proper under the Western Jin dynasty.

Background
As early as 262, Sima Zhao, a regent of the Cao Wei state in the Three Kingdoms period, had already planned the first outline for the conquest of Wei's rival states, Eastern Wu and Shu Han, by eliminating Shu first, then take on Wu three years later. However, the conquest of Shu in the following year severely strained Wei's resources and Wei desperately needed time to recover. Compounding the problem, Wei lacked an adequate naval force required for the campaign on Wu. Sima Zhao therefore postponed the planned conquest of Wu and started to consolidate power in Wei first. In 265, Sima Zhao died and was succeeded by his son, Sima Yan (Emperor Wu). Sima Yan usurped the throne from the last Wei emperor Cao Huan and established the Jin dynasty (266–420) with himself as the emperor. After this event, only Eastern Wu was left of the three major powers in the Three Kingdoms period.

In comparison with Wei and the subsequent Jin dynasty, Eastern Wu experienced greater problems of its own: the succession from the third Wu emperor, Sun Xiu, was marred with bloodshed and internal conflict. Sun Xiu's successor, Sun Hao, was a tyrant who made little effort to prepare for the imminent invasion by the Jin dynasty. Sun Hao's rule was more harsh as compared to the later part of the reign of Sun Quan, Wu's founding emperor. This caused a continuous wave of peasant uprisings and military mutinies, which mainly took place in present-day Zhejiang and Guangdong. Not only did Sun Hao refuse to accept advice to strengthen Wu's defences and reduce the burden on its people, he also executed around four dozen high-ranking officials who provided good counsel on governance. As a result, the Wu government had already lost the popular support of the people, and many regional commanders stationed at the border defected to the Jin dynasty.

Prelude
To stabilise the newly conquered state of Shu, as well as showing benevolence towards the people of Wu so that they would defect or surrender to the Jin dynasty, Emperor Wu of Jin enfeoffed the former Shu emperor Liu Shan as a duke and awarded marquis titles to over 50 former Shu officials. Zhuge Liang's grandson, Zhuge Jing (諸葛京), also received important appointments in the Jin government. At the same time, Emperor Wu sent envoys to Eastern Wu to cease hostilities between the two states, in order to buy time for making preparations. Eastern Wu's emperor Sun Hao, in turn, viewed such actions as a sign of weakness of the Jin dynasty, and further let down his guard.

Jin preparations
Jin preparations for the conquest of Wu begun in 269, when three places were selected as bases to launch the attack. New assignments were given as follows:

 Yang Hu was appointed as the viceroy of Jing Province and stationed at Xiangyang.
 Wei Guan was appointed as the viceroy of Qing Province and stationed at Linzi (臨菑; northeast of present-day Zibo, Shandong).
 Sima Zhou was appointed as the viceroy of Xu Province and stationed at Xiapi (下邳; northwest of present-day Suining County, Jiangsu).

On Yang Hu's recommendation, Emperor Wu appointed Wang Jun as the viceroy of Yi Province (covering present-day Sichuan and Chongqing) in 272, and soon after, on Du Yu's advice, Emperor Wu promoted Wang Jun to Prancing Dragon General (龍驤將軍). Wang Jun was put in charge of building a strong navy for the conquest of Wu. An ambitious general who was already turning 70, Wang Jun was eager to establish fame by the conquest of Wu, and while he was still the Inspector of Yi Province, he already begun the process. The new ranks sped up the process tremendously by enabling Wang Jun to draft much more men: in comparison to the 500 to 600 workers previously available, every commandery within Yi Province must provide him with 10,000 men. As a result, the remaining work of the naval construction project was completed in a year.

To make up for their lack of experience of naval warfare in comparison to Eastern Wu's navy, Wang Jun built many large ships with ram bows. The largest ship was in excess of 170 metres and could carry around 2,000 troops on board. The fortifications on these ships were three stories tall and was claimed to be the largest at the time. It took Wang Jun a total of seven years to build the navy he needed to conquer Eastern Wu and the only thing left to do was to train his soldiers and sailors.

In October 276, the preparation was roughly completed and Yang Hu suggested to Emperor Wu to launch the attack. Yang Hu's suggestion was initially accepted but then delayed due to Jia Chong's objection, because the Xianbei tribes in northwestern China had started a rebellion. In July 277, additional assignments were given in order to prepare for the campaign against Eastern Wu:

 Wang Hun was put in charge of military affairs of Yang Province
 Sima Liang was put in charge of military affairs of Yu Province
 Hu Fen (胡奮) was put in charge of military affairs along the northern shore of the Yangtze River

After Yang Hu's death, Du Yu succeeded him and was appointed Senior General Who Conquers the South (征南大將軍) to take charge of military affairs in Jing Province from November 278.

Wu preparations
In comparison to the active preparation of its adversary, the Wu emperor Sun Hao did nearly nothing to defend against an invasion. Some leftover wooden pieces from Wang Jun's naval construction project flowed downstream and were picked up by the Eastern Wu general Wu Yan (吾彥). Wu Yan sent the wooden pieces to Sun Hao as evidence of the imminent attack and asked for reinforcements, but Sun Hao ignored the request as he did to similar suggestions from Lu Kang and others.

After Lu Kang's death, his military command was split among his five sons as follows:

 Lu Yan (陸晏) was appointed as the commander of the land force
 Lu Jing was appointed as the commander of the navy
 Lu Xuan (陸玄) was appointed as the deputy commander of the land force
 Lu Ji was appointed as the deputy commander of the navy
 Lu Yun (陸雲) was appointed as the commander of the local garrison

This division of power greatly weakened Wu's defences and three of Lu Kang's sons were killed in battle during the Jin invasion.

Strategic planning
In 279, Wang Jun thought that it was time to launch the decisive attack on Wu. However, the majority of officials in the imperial court strongly objected to launching an invasion, except Du Yu and Zhang Hua, who strongly supported Wang Jun's idea. The two of them managed to convince Emperor Wu to agree with them, and the strategy of Jin was basically the one planned by Yang Hu when he was still alive. 200,000 troops out of the 500,000 strong regular army were deployed for the campaign, and by this time, the Jin navy was also at least on par with the Eastern Wu navy.

Jin strategy
The Jin army did not enjoy numerical superiority because it faced the entire Wu force of 230,000 and over 5,000 ships that defended the state. However, the morale of Jin was much higher than Wu. Furthermore, the Wu forces was scattered along the several thousand miles long border, and the attacking Jin armies could concentrate their forces to attack the isolated pockets of Wu resistance. Based on this principle, Jin would attack Wu along the Yangtze River in five routes to support the main attack force led by Wang Jun from Sichuan, going downstream along the Yangtze.

Wang Hun and Sima Zhou were tasked to tie down the main force of Wu, preventing it from reinforcing the upstream Yangtze River by threatening Wu's capital, Jianye (present-day Nanjing, Jiangsu). Wang Rong, Du Yu and Hu Fen (胡奮) were tasked to take all strongholds of Wu located to the west of Xiakou (夏口; present-day Wuchang District, Hubei) to coordinate with the 70,000 strong main force led by Wang Jun. After the attacking forces had joined together, they would push toward east along the Yangtze River and the capture of Jianye would be the responsibility of Wang Hun, Sima Zhou and Wang Jun. To better coordinate the attack, Emperor Wu ordered that Wang Jun would be under Du Yu's command after reaching Jianping, and after reaching Jianye, he would be under Wang Hun's command.

Wu strategy
Since the Wu emperor Sun Hao did not believe that the Jin dynasty was capable of taking Wu and the overconfidence in the Yangtze River as the natural defensive barrier, barely anything was done to prepare for the incoming campaign. However, Wu did reinforce its defences by deploying iron awls linked together by iron chains in the Three Gorges to prevent ships from passing, but Sun Hao and his followers were so overconfident about this additional measure that not a single soldier was deployed to guard the region.

The campaign

Battles at the upstream of the Yangtze River
Wang Jun's navy began its downstream Yangtze River attack in December 279 after being joined by his deputy, Tang Bin (唐彬) in charge of Badong Commandery (巴東郡; present-day Fengjie County, Chongqing). The combined force totalled 70,000. A month later, Du Yu begun his attack on Jiangling County from Xiangyang and sent three of his advisers – Fan Xian (樊顯), Yin Lin (尹林) Deng Gui (鄧圭) – along with Zhou Qi (周奇), the Administrator of Xiangyang, westward along the Yangtze River to join Wang Jun in attacking the strongholds of Wu between them from both the east and the west. By early March 280, Wang Jun's army had taken Danyang (丹楊; east of present-day Zigui County, Hubei) from Wu, and captured its defending officer, Sheng Ji (盛紀).

The Jin fleet under Wang Jun's command continued on after taking Danyang and upon reaching Xiling Gorge, they had met obstacles set up by Wu, the iron awls linked together by iron chains in water. However, Wang Jun had already captured most of Wu's agents, as well as many prisoners-of-war, and based on the information obtained from the captives, the Jin forces already had a detailed knowledge of Wu's defences, knowing exactly where the weakest spots were and where to attack. The Jin navy deployed dozens of rafts ahead of the fleet and when the iron awls struck the rafts, they were stuck. The rafts were full of dummies soaked in oil which were lit, causing the iron chains and awls to melt. After several hours, those man-made obstacles were completely cleared and the Jin fleet continued advancing.

By 20 March 280, Jin forces had taken Xiling (西陵; northwest of present-day Yichang, Hubei), and two days later, Jingmen and Yidao (夷道; present-day Yidu, Hubei) also fell under Jin control. All major Wu commanders, including Liu Xian (留憲), Cheng Ju (成據), Yu Zhong and Lu Yan were captured and then executed. The victorious Jin fleet continued its offensive against Lexiang (樂鄉; northeast of present-day Songzi, Hubei), defeating the local Wu forces who ventured out of the protection of city walls in an attempt to stop the Jin assault.

In the meantime, Du Yu had sent his subordinate Zhou Zhi (周旨) to cross the Yangtze River with 800 horsemen at night to plant many flags in Mount Ba (巴山; southwest of present-day Songzi, Hubei), appearing to be a much larger force, while laying ambush just outside Lexiang. As the local Wu garrison went out earlier to engage Wang Jun's force retreated back to the city after their defeat, Zhou Zhi and his men were able to sneak into the city and capture it. The defending officer of Lexiang, Sun Xin (孫歆), was captured by Zhou Zhi and sent to Du Yu. Wang Jun, in his report to the Jin imperial court, claimed that Sun Xin was killed in action. In fact, it was Wu's naval commander-in-chief, Lu Jing, who was killed when Lexiang fell to the Jin forces. Du Yu's army subsequently conquered Jiangling and killed the Wu general Wu Yan (伍延).

Redeployment of Jin forces
On 4 April 280, Emperor Wu strengthened the main force under Wang Jun's command by redeploying troops under other commanders:

 Du Yu to attack southward to take Lingling (零陵; present-day Yongzhou, Hunan), Guiyang (桂陽; present-day Chenzhou, Hunan), and Hengyang (衡陽; west of present-day Xiangtan, Hunan), and 10,000 troops under Du Yu's command would be reassigned to Wang Jun, and another 7,000 troops under Du Yu's command would be reassigned to Wang Jun's deputy, Tang Bin (唐彬).
 Hu Fen (胡奮) would take Xiakou (夏口; present-day Hankou, Hubei) together with Wang Jun's force, and after the city was taken, 7,000 troops under Hu Fen's command would be reassigned to Wang Jun.
 Wang Rong would join forces with Wang Jun to take Wuchang (武昌; present-day Ezhou, Hubei), and after the city was taken, 6,000 troops under Wang Rong's command would be reassigned to Wang Jun's deputy, Tang Bin.
 After taking Baqiu (巴丘; present-day Yueyang, Hunan), Wang Jun's force would join forces with other commanders to take other cities as mentioned above, and then continue on toward Jianye, the capital of Eastern Wu.

Following Emperor Wu's orders, Wang Jun continued his offensive and Wu general Meng Tai (孟泰) surrendered with his forces guarding Qichun and Zhu (邾; present day Huanggang, Hubei) counties. The next target was also captured without much fight: after Wang Rong's force led by Luo Shang and Liu Qiao (劉喬) joined Wang Jun and begun their offensive, Liu Lang (劉朗), the Administrator of Wuchang, lost his will to resist and surrendered without a fight. With the exception of Jianping, which was defended by Wu Yan (吾彦), the Administrator of Jianping, all other territories of Wu on the upper Yangtze River had fallen under the Jin dynasty's control.

By this time, Jia Chong, the Jin commander-in-chief of the campaign who had opposed the campaign from the start, had found the opportunity to suggest a conclusion of the campaign. Jia Chong claimed that it was good to withdraw after the continuous victories because if the war continues, it would exhaust the resources of the state and troops remain the south would suffer from epidemics. However, the war progressed much faster and better than Jia Chong had predicted and his suggestion was ignored.

Battles midstream and downstream of the Yangtze River
At the midstream and downstream of the Yangtze River, starting in mid February 280, Wang Hun conquered Wu's territories of Xunyang (尋陽; southwest of present-day Huangmei County, Hubei), Gaowang (高望; southwest of present-day Pu County 浦縣), and Laixiang (賴鄉), capturing the Wu general Zhou Xing (周興). Sima Zhou took Tuzhong (涂中) and sent his subordinate Liu Hong (劉弘) to solidify the newly captured territory on the northern shore of the Yangtze River. Meanwhile, Sima Zhou sent Wang Heng (王恆) to cross the Yangtze River and continue attacking Wu. Wang Heng's army captured the Wu general Cai Ji (蔡機) and killed more than 60,000 Wu troops in the battle.

Surprised with the news of attack, Sun Hao ordered Zhang Ti, Zhuge Jing, Shen Ying (沈瑩) and Sun Zhen (孫震) to lead a 30,000-strong army to engage the enemy. Zhang Ti decided the only chance for Wu was to immediately venture out to stop the enemy before their morale collapsed, and if the enemy's advance could be beaten back or at least checked, his force would join the Wu forces in the upstream Yangtze River to strengthen their position. In mid April 280, Zhang Ti led his force across the Yangtze River and besieged Wang Hun's subordinate Zhang Qiao (張喬). Zhang Qiao only had 7,000 troops and surrendered. Zhuge Jing suspected that the surrender was a trick and asked Zhang Ti to execute Zhang Qiao, but Zhang Ti refused, and instead, accepted Zhang Qiao's surrender. As a precaution measure, Zhang Ti did order Zhang Qiao to remain by his side so that Zhang Qiao would not have the chance to escape back to Jin.

As the Wu army continued on, they encountered Jin forces led by Zhang Han (張翰) and Zhou Jun (周濬). Shen Ying personally led 5,000 crack troops from Danyang to charge into the Jin army's formation thrice, but was beaten back with heavy losses. The defeat of the elite force seriously demoralised the rest of the Wu soldiers, and the result was a disorganised retreat. Seizing on the opportunity, the Jin generals Xue Sheng (薛勝) and Jiang Ban (蔣班) launched a surprise counterattack, defeating the Wu forces and killing over 5,800 enemy troops. As the surviving Wu forces fled from the battlefield, the surrendered Zhang Qiao attacked the fleeing Wu soldiers from the opposite direction at Banqiao (版橋), inflicting a further 2,000 fatalities on the already defeated Wu army. Zhang Ti, Shen Ying, and Sun Zhen were all killed in the decisive battle that shocked Wu. Only Zhuge Jing managed to escape alive back to Jianye. Wang Hun's subordinate urged him to press on to attack Jianye immediately, but he refused under the excuse that he was ordered by Emperor Wu to secure the northern shore of Yangtze River only and wait for Wang Jun. Wang Hun was in fact, taking a more cautious approaching by attempting to join forces with Wang Jun to ensure the final victory, but such prudence cost him the glory of capturing the Wu capital, the highest honour in the campaign.

Wang Jun's 80,000 strong army, meanwhile, reached Niuzhu (牛渚) on 30 April 280, after leaving Wuchang (武昌; present-day Ezhou, Hubei) and the Wu emperor Sun Hao ordered Zhang Xiang (張象) to lead a 10,000 strong navy to engage the enemy. However, when both fleets met, the demoralised Wu navy surrendered en masse, including Zhang Xiang himself. Wang Hun ordered Wang Jun to see him so that they could discuss their next move, but Wang Jun answered that his fleet had already passed Wang Hun's camp and could not turn back due to the current, and continued on toward Jianye.

As Wang Jun's forces advanced on to Sanshan (三山) on 30 April 280, just southeast of Jianye, the Wu general Tao Jun (陶濬) organised a 20,000 strong army to make a last stand, but nearly all the Wu troops deserted on the very same night, and Tao Jun and his few remaining followers were killed subsequently in their futile struggle against the Jin invaders. Sun Hao adopted a last attempt suggested by his subjects Xue Ying and Hu Chong (胡沖) by sending letters of surrender to Sima Zhou, Wang Jun and Wang Hun, in a move to stir up internal conflict among the Jin commanders in order to buy time, but such a tactic proved useless.

On 1 May 280, Sun Hao stripped all clothing on his upper body and tied himself up (a traditional way of presenting prisoners-of-war to the victors) and walked to Wang Jun's camp to surrender. Prior to that, Sun Hao issued his last imperial decree, asking his people not to be upset with the end of Wu, but prepare themselves to serve the Jin dynasty. Sun Hao was then taken to the Jin capital Luoyang with his imperial chariot, but was not allowed to ride on it. Instead, he travelled on foot as he was now a prisoner-of-war. After hearing of Sun Hao's surrender, the last pocket of Wu resistance in Jianping, led by Wu Yan (吾彥), followed suit even after having successfully defended against all Jin attacks throughout the campaign.

Aftermath
The fall of Jianye marked the end of Wu and the Three Kingdoms period, and China was unified again under the Jin dynasty. The Jin commanders who participated in the campaign were handsomely rewarded, and ironically, Jia Chong, the overall commander who had opposed the campaign received the largest reward, the tax income of 8,000 households. Wang Hun was furious upon learning the news of Wang Jun taking Jianye, and angrily proclaimed to his subordinates that he had watched Sun Hao for nearly a hundred days, but Wang Jun took the advantage at last. Wang Hun wrote to the imperial court to complain, claiming that Wang Jun disobeyed orders and embezzled the spoils of war. Wang Jun also wrote to the imperial court to defend himself, claiming that what Wang Hun had said was slander. However, Wang Hun was much more powerful and influential in the Jin court, thus had gained an upper hand, with his followers suggesting that Wang Jun be jailed. In the end, Emperor Wu put an end to the conflict by rewarding Wang Jun handsomely.

Order of battle
To boost morale, some of the Jin commanders received new ranks, while in contrast, Wu did almost nothing to reinforce its own defense.

Jin forces
Grand Chief Controller (大都督) Jia Chong
Champion General (冠軍將軍) Yang Ji (楊濟), served as Jia Chong's deputy
Secretary of Fiscal Revenue (度支尚書) Zhang Hua was in charge of supplies and logistics
General Who Guards the Army (鎮軍將軍) Sima Zhou would attack Tuzhong (涂中) from Xiapi (下邳)
Chancellor of Langya (瑯琊相) Liu Hong (劉弘)
Chief Clerk (長史) Wang Heng (王恆)
General Who Stabilises the East (安東將軍) Wang Hun (王渾), would attack Hezhou (和州) from Yang Province
General Who Protects the Army (護軍將軍) Zhang Han (張翰)
Inspector of Yang Province (揚州刺史) Zhou Jun (周濬)
Xue Sheng (薛勝)
Jiang Ban (蔣班)
Senior General Who Attacks the South (征南大將軍) Du Yu would attack Jiangling (江陵) from Xiangyang
Army Adviser (參軍) Fan Xian (樊顯)
Army Adviser Yin Lin (尹林)
Army Adviser Deng Gui (鄧圭)
Administrator of Xiangyang (襄陽太守) Zhou Qi (周奇)
General of the Standard (牙門將軍) Zhou Zhi (周旨)
General Who Establishes Martial Might (建威將軍) Wang Rong would attack Wuchang (武昌; present-day Ezhou, Hubei) from Yu Province
Army Adviser (參軍) Luo Shang (羅尚)
Army Adviser Liu Qiao (劉喬)
Commandant of Chengyang (成陽都尉) Zhang Qiao (張喬)
General Who Pacifies the South (平南將軍) Hu Fen (胡奮) would attack Xiakou (夏口; present-day Wuchang District, Hubei) from Jing Province
Prancing Dragon General (龍驤將軍) Wang Jun would attack downstream from Sichuan along the Yangtze River
General Who Spreads Martial Might (廣武將軍) Tang Bin (唐彬), defended Badong (巴東; present-day Fengjie County, Chongqing)

Wu forces

Before 17 April 280
 Grand Chief Controller (大都督) Lu Yan (陸晏)
Lu Xuan (陸玄), served as Lu Yan's deputy
 General of Martial Might (武威將軍) Zhou Xing (周興)
 Cai Ji (蔡機)
 Supervisor of Danyang (丹楊監) Sheng Ji (盛紀)
 General Who Guards the South (鎮南將軍) Liu Xian (留憲)
 General Who Attacks the South (征南將軍) Cheng Ju (成據)
 Administrator of Yidu (宜都太守) Yu Zhong (虞忠)
Commander of Lexiang (樂鄉督) Sun Xin (孫歆)
 Commander of Jiangling (江陵督) Wu Yan (伍延)
 General of the Standard (牙門將軍) Meng Tai (孟泰)
 Administrator of Wuchang (武昌太守) Liu Lang (劉朗)
 Lu Jing served as commander of the naval force
 Lu Ji served as deputy commander of the naval force

After 17 April 280
 Imperial Chancellor (丞相) Zhang Ti
Deputy Military Adviser (副軍師) Zhuge Jing
 Administrator of Danyang (丹陽太守) Shen Ying (沈瑩)
 General Who Protects the Army (護軍將軍) Sun Zhen (孫震)
 Guerrilla General (游擊將軍) Zhang Xiang (張象)
 Commander of Xuling (徐陵督) Tao Jun (陶濬)
 Administrator of Jianping (建平太守) Wu Yan (吾彥)

In Romance of the Three Kingdoms
In the 14th-century historical novel Romance of the Three Kingdoms, the task of building a navy for the Jin dynasty was credited to Zhong Hui before the fall of Shu, when Zhong Hui recommended to Sima Zhao that constructing a large navy to attack Wu was a diversion to trick Shu into letting down its guard, and when it was time to truly attack Wu after the conquest of Shu, the navy would be ready. In reality, however, the idea of constructing a large navy originated from Wang Jun and Emperor Wu, and the plan was set into motion only after the fall of Shu.

In the novel, the last event before the campaign ended was described to be Zhang Xiang's surrender when he led a 10,000 strong navy to engage Jin forces. Since the Wu imperial court had not received news of Zhang Xiang's surrender yet, Wang Jun ordered Zhang Xiang to return to the Wu capital Jianye to trick the Wu defenders into opening the city gates. Zhang Xiang followed as instructed and Jin forces swiftly conquered Jianye. The Wu emperor Sun Hao surrendered and that marked the end of Wu. In history, however, before Sun Hao's surrender, there was one last battle at Sanshan (三山), just southeast of Jianye, between Wang Jun's army and a smaller force led by Wu general Tao Jun (陶濬).

References

 
 Chen, Shou (3rd century). Records of the Three Kingdoms (Sanguozhi).
 Fang, Xuanling (648). Book of Jin (Jin Shu).
 Pei, Songzhi (5th century). Annotations to Records of the Three Kingdoms (Sanguozhi zhu).
 Sima, Guang (1084). Zizhi Tongjian.
 
 

279
280
Campaigns of the Three Kingdoms
Jin dynasty (266–420)